Killer of Sheep is a 1978 American drama film edited, filmed, written, produced, and directed by Charles Burnett. Shot primarily in 1972 and 1973, it was originally submitted by Burnett to the UCLA School of Film in 1977 as his Master of Fine Arts thesis. It features Henry G. Sanders, Kaycee Moore, and Charles Bracy, among others, in acting roles.

The film depicts the culture of urban African-Americans in Los Angeles' Watts district in a style often likened to Italian neorealism. Critic Dana Stevens described its plot as "a collection of brief vignettes which are so loosely connected that it feels at times like you're watching a non-narrative film." There are no acts, plot arcs or character development, as conventionally defined.

Killer of Sheep premiered at the Whitney Museum of American Art in New York on November 14, 1978. It did not receive a general release because Burnett had not secured rights to the music used in its production. The music rights were purchased in 2007 for US $150,000 and the film was restored and transferred from a 16 mm to a 35 mm print. Killer of Sheep received a limited release 30 years after it was completed, with a DVD release in late 2007. The film was restored by the UCLA preservationist Ross Lipman and produced on DVD by Steven Soderbergh and Milestone Films. In 1990, the film was selected for preservation in the United States National Film Registry by the Library of Congress as being "culturally, historically, or aesthetically significant".

Plot
Stan works long hours at a slaughterhouse in Watts, Los Angeles. The monotonous slaughter affects his home life with his unnamed wife and his two children, Stan Jr. and Angela. Through a series of confusing episodic events—some friends try to involve Stan in a criminal plot, a white woman propositions Stan to work in her store, and Stan and his friend Bracy attempt to buy a car engine—a mosaic of an austere working-class life emerges in which Stan feels unable to affect the course of his life.

Cast
Henry G. Sanders as Stan
Kaycee Moore as Stan's wife
Charles Bracy as Bracy
Angela Burnett as Stan's daughter
Eugene Cherry as Eugene
Jack Drummond as Stan's son

Production
Burnett used grant money from the UCLA School of Film to help finance the film, but delayed production because his first choice of actor was in prison and he wanted to wait until he was paroled. Meanwhile, he made the short film The Horse. When the university insisted he make his thesis film with or without his first-choice actor, Burnett cast Henry Sanders.

Directed by Charles Burnett, Killer of Sheep was shot in Watts on a budget of less than US$10,000 ($38,000 in 2016 dollars) over roughly a year's worth of weekends in 1972 and 1973, with additional shooting in 1975. In 1977, Burnett submitted the film as his Master of Fine Arts thesis at the School of Film at the University of California, Los Angeles. Burnett said he also intended to make the film a history of African-American music and filled it with music from a variety of genres and different eras. Burnett also kept a stable job while Killer of Sheep was being shot, spending his time working at an agency reading scripts and synopsis.

Roof jumping scene 
One scene contains a low-angle shot of children leaping from rooftop to rooftop. Juliet Clark, a journalist writing for the Berkeley Art Museum and Pacific Film Archive, said the scene shows how children in the film "seem to achieve a mobility that eludes their elders".

In 2009, a still from the scene, showing one of the boys mid-jump, was reproduced in red tint and used as the cover of rapper Mos Def's album The Ecstatic. According to Complex magazine's Dale Eisinger, the "subtle and still-moving" cover has a "hazy, dream-like movement, appearing as a non-narrative, loose collection of vignettes that are tangentially fascinating and incredibly powerful", while reflecting the ideas of cultural justice and global inequality present throughout Mos Def's work.

Critical reception
Though the film won the Critics' Award at the Berlin International Film Festival and was acclaimed at the Toronto International Film Festival, it never saw wide release due to complications in securing the music rights for the 22 songs on the soundtrack, which included such big names as Dinah Washington, Paul Robeson, Louis Armstrong, and Earth, Wind and Fire. It remained in obscurity for nearly 30 years, garnering much critical and academic praise and earning a reputation as a lost classic. The film did not win an award until four years after it came out, after having to wait four years to be released.

Killer of Sheep holds a 97% "fresh" rating on Rotten Tomatoes; the consensus states: "By turns funny, sad, and profound, Killer of Sheep offers a sympathetic and humane glimpse into inner-city life." Critics and scholars have likened the film to the work of Italian neorealist directors, particularly Vittorio De Sica and Roberto Rossellini, for its documentary aesthetic and use of mostly non-professional, on-location actors. Burnett has also been compared to Yasujirō Ozu for his strong sense of composition, Stanley Kubrick for his sharp ear for juxtaposing popular music with images, John Cassavetes for his knack for coaxing natural performances from amateur actors, and Robert Altman for his interest in the minutiae of human interaction. Burnett's self-professed influences are Jean Renoir, Basil Wright, and Federico Fellini, all of whom exemplify the tender, humane and compassionate qualities for which Burnett has been praised, qualities intensely present in Killer of Sheep. Critic Andrew O'Hehir, noting the strong influences of Jean Renoir, Roberto Rossellini, and Satyajit Ray, said, "It's hard to overemphasize how strange and ambitious and completely out of context it was for a black urban filmmaker with no money and no reputation to make that kind of movie in 1977."

In 1990, the Library of Congress selected it for preservation in the United States National Film Registry for being "culturally, historically, or aesthetically significant." 

In 2008, Empire magazine ranked the film No. 398 of The 500 Greatest Movies of All Time. 

The National Society of Film Critics chose Killer of Sheep as one of its 100 Essential Films. 

In 2015, the BBC named the film the 26th greatest American movie ever made.

Lists
The film appeared on several critics' top ten lists of the best films of 2007.
1st – Ed Gonzalez, Slant Magazine
2nd – Philip Martin, Arkansas Democrat-Gazette
3rd – Glenn Kenny, Premiere
3rd – Michael Sragow, The Baltimore Sun
3rd – Nick Schager, Slant Magazine
3rd – Richard Corliss, TIME magazine
5th – Dana Stevens, Slate
10th – Ella Taylor, LA Weekly

Distribution
Having previously only existed on worn 16mm prints, the film was restored and enlarged to 35mm by the UCLA Film and Television Archive and Milestone Films, thanks in part to a donation from filmmaker Steven Soderbergh. The soundtrack, which had not been licensed, was also paid for at a cost of over US$150 000.

On March 30, 2007, it opened in select theaters in the United States and Canada and on November 13, 2007, it was released on DVD as part of a deluxe box set with a director's cut of Burnett's sophomore feature My Brother's Wedding and three Burnett shorts: Several Friends (a 1969 aesthetic precursor to Killer of Sheep), The Horse (an "allegory of the South", in Burnett's words), and When It Rains (praised as one of the greatest short films of all time by critic Jonathan Rosenbaum).

On Martin Luther King Jr. Day, January 21, 2008, Turner Classic Movies presented the world broadcast premiere of the film as part of a night-long marathon of Burnett's work. Burnett was interviewed before and after the film by TCM's primetime host Robert Osborne.

See also
L.A. Rebellion
Undun
To Sleep with Anger

References

External links

Ghetto Blues: Beauty & Despair in Watts (TCM Movie Morlocks)
Killer of Sheep essay by Daniel Eagan in America's Film Legacy: The Authoritative Guide to the Landmark Movies in the National Film Registry, Bloomsbury Academic, 2010 , pages 737-738 
Cinema Then, Cinema Now: Killer of Sheep a 1993 discussion of the film with Basil Wilson, hosted by Jerry Carlson of CUNY TV

1978 films
1978 drama films
1978 independent films
1970s English-language films
African-American drama films
Films directed by Charles Burnett (director)
American black-and-white films
American independent films
Social realism in film
United States National Film Registry films
Films set in Los Angeles
Films shot in Los Angeles
Films about sheep
Non-narrative films
American student films
1978 directorial debut films
Rediscovered American films
1970s rediscovered films
1970s American films